Asteridiella perseae is a plant pathogen that causes black mildew on avocado.

References

External links
 USDA ARS Fungal Database

Fungal tree pathogens and diseases
Avocado tree diseases
Meliolaceae